Ubykhia was a commonwealth of Ubykh tribe of Circassians and a province of Circassia in the 14th–19th centuries. It was situated in what is today Sochi, Krasnodar Krai, Russia.

Ubykhs supplanted the Sadz Abkhazians from the area in the 17th century, and unlike the principality of Abkhazia, there were no princes in Ubykhia and it was governed by the council, which represented the nobles from all 11 Ubykh subdivisions and 2 from Akhchipsou and Sadz peoples, incorporated to the commonwealth.

In 1864 Ubykhia was defeated in the Russo-Circassian War and the population, estimated to be about 40,000, was exiled to the Ottoman Empire en masse, which almost resulted in the total disappearance of the Ubykhs.

References
Bagrat Shinkuba. The Last of the Departed on Adyghe Library

Circassians
History of Sochi